Máel Ruanaid Ua Ruadáin (died 1170) was Bishop of Achonry from 1152 until his death.

He was present at the Synod of Kells.

References 

1188 deaths
12th-century Roman Catholic bishops in Ireland
Bishops of Achonry